The Church of the Holy Comforter, built in 1872, is a historic Carpenter Gothic  church located on Main Street, in Brownsville, Minnesota, on the west bank of the Mississippi River in the United States. It began as an Episcopal church, but later became a Methodist Episcopal church. In the 1940s, it became Emmanuel Lutheran Church. It had been vacant since 1963. On June 2, 1970, the church was added to the National Register of Historic Places.

Current use
The church is not in use but is open by appointment only.

See also

List of Registered Historic Places in Minnesota

References

External links
 
History of Brownsville photo

19th-century Episcopal church buildings
Buildings and structures in Houston County, Minnesota
Carpenter Gothic church buildings in Minnesota
Episcopal church buildings in Minnesota
Churches on the National Register of Historic Places in Minnesota
Churches completed in 1872
National Register of Historic Places in Houston County, Minnesota